Typha × suwensis is a plant of hybrid origin, endemic to central Japan named after Suwa Province (諏方国 Suwa no kuni) west of Tokyo. It apparently originated as a cross between the two very widespread species T. latifolia and T. orientalis.  Typha × suwensis grows in freshwater marshes.

References

suwensis
Freshwater plants
Plant nothospecies
Endemic flora of Japan
Plants described in 1989